Jimmy Mayanja (born 29 December 1958) is a Swedish boxer. He competed in the men's bantamweight event at the 1988 Summer Olympics.

References

External links
 

1958 births
Living people
Swedish male boxers
Olympic boxers of Sweden
Boxers at the 1988 Summer Olympics
People from Jinja District
Bantamweight boxers